Friedrich Adolph Roemer (15 April 1809 – 25 November 1869), German geologist, was born at Hildesheim, in the Kingdom of Westphalia.

His father was a lawyer and councillor of the high court of justice. In 1845 he became professor of mineralogy and geology at Clausthal, and in 1862 named director of the School of Mines. He first described the Cretaceous and Jurassic strata of Germany in elaborate works entitled Die Versteinerungen des Norddeutschen Oolith-Gebirges ("Fossils of the North German oolith formations"; 1836–39), Die Versteinerungen des Norddeutschen Kreidegebirges ("Fossils of the North German chalk formations"; 1840–41) and Die Versteinerungen des Harzgebirges ("Fossils of the Harz Mountains"; 1843). He died in Clausthal.

The mineral romerite commemorates his name, as does Roemeriana, a publication issued by the Institute of Geology at the Bergakademie in Clausthal from 1954 to 1964. His students included Albrecht von Groddeck.

His younger brother, Carl Ferdinand von Roemer, was also a geologist.

References

External links 

19th-century German geologists
19th-century German botanists
1809 births
1869 deaths
People from Hildesheim
Academic staff of the Clausthal University of Technology